The Ghana women's national football team has represented Ghana at the FIFA Women's World Cup on three occasions: in 1999, 2003, and 2007.

FIFA Women's World Cup record

Record by opponent

1999 FIFA Women's World Cup

Group D

2003 FIFA Women's World Cup

Group D

2007 FIFA Women's World Cup

Group C

Goalscorers

References

 
Countries at the FIFA Women's World Cup